The Bronze and Brass Museum is a museum located in Bhaktapur, Nepal.

References

See also 
 List of museums in Nepal

Bhaktapur
Museums in Nepal